Park Ji-yeong (born 6 June 1971) is a South Korean judoka. She competed in the women's middleweight event at the 1992 Summer Olympics.

References

1971 births
Living people
South Korean female judoka
Olympic judoka of South Korea
Judoka at the 1992 Summer Olympics
Place of birth missing (living people)
Judoka at the 1990 Asian Games
Asian Games medalists in judo
Asian Games bronze medalists for South Korea
Medalists at the 1990 Asian Games
20th-century South Korean women